Limnos (F451) is an  of the Hellenic Navy, and the third Greek warship to bear the name. The class is based on the Royal Netherlands Navy's  and was built in a Dutch shipyard; however, unlike later members of her class in the Hellenic Navy, she was not originally in Dutch service, but was sold directly to Greece. Limnos was constructed in Vlissingen, Netherlands, along with her sister ship . The contract for her construction was signed in Athens in July 1981 and her commissioning took place on 18 September 1982. After commissioning, Limnos joined the Hellenic Fleet on 5 November 1982 and since then she has actively participated in its activities.

Service history
Limnos took part in several operations including Operation Desert Storm and Operation Desert Shield in 1990 and 1991. She was part of the security arrangements for the 2004 Summer Olympics in Athens as part of Operation Ifitos, and with Operation Ocean Shield, the NATO contribution to the anti-piracy initiative, in 2009. In 2011 she deployed with Operation Unified Protector, the NATO operation to enforce United Nations Security Council resolutions regarding the Libyan Civil War, and with Operation Active Endeavour, an anti-terrorism mission in the Mediterranean.

August 2020 collision with TCG Kemal Reis 
On 13 August 2020, Turkish President Recep Tayyip Erdoğan announced that any attack on the Turkish research vessel  will incur a "high price" and suggested that Turkey had already acted on that warning. This came after unconfirmed reports that Limnos collided with the frigate , one of the ships of the Turkish Navy that were escorting Oruç Reis, which resumed drilling operations southeast of the Greek island of Kastellorizo on 10 August, after suspending its work in July. 

On the following day, the Hellenic Ministry of National Defence released a date stamped photograph of Limnos conducting joint drills with four other Greek frigates and two units of the French Navy in that same area. According to unnamed "Greek defense sources", the Greek frigate manoeuvred to avoid a head-on collision, after Kemalreis attempted to "block" Limnos path and in the process its bow touched the rear of the Turkish frigate. Initially, the Turkish frigate's fate remained unconfirmed, despite reports that mentioned it was deemed non-operational due to propeller damage, requiring return to port for repairs. Later on the same day and in response however, the Turkish Ministry of Defense released a video of the ship in social media, declaring that Kemalreis was also fully operational and its condition was unchanged, normally continuing its original mission. As a response to the Turkish President's statements, the Greek Ministry of Foreign Affairs issued a statement, announcing that the Greek Foreign Minister would brief in detail his European counterparts on the operational and technical details of that incident.

On 19 August, Greek newspaper Kathimerini published a photograph depicting the damage sustained to the right side of the stern of the Turkish frigate during the collision. Several Turkish newspapers published a video showing Kemalreis was not damaged at the bow.

Coat of arms
The coat of arms of the ship is a copy of the battleship Lemnos's coat of arms. It depicts the lyra of the ancient poet and kitharode Arion and dolphins in waves.

References

External links
Official Hellenic Navy page for Standard Class Frigates (English)
Official Hellenic Navy page

Elli-class frigates
Ships built in Vlissingen
1981 ships
Gulf War ships of Greece
Frigates of Greece
Frigates of the Cold War